The lycid-mimicking moth (Snellenia lineata) is a species of moth of the family Stathmopodidae. It is found Australia in the Australian Capital Territory, New South Wales, Queensland and Victoria.

The wingspan is about 15 mm. The wings are brown, the hindwings shading to black at the margins. The thorax is brown, and the abdomen is black. The antennae have filamentous tips. Adults feed at flowers and are often found near poisonous Lycidae beetles of the genus Metriorrhynchus, which they mimic.

References

Moths described in 1856
Stathmopodidae